Nino Pirrotta (13 June 1908 in Palermo – 22 January 1998 in Palermo) was an Italian musicologist of international renown who specialized in Italian music from the late medieval, Renaissance and early Baroque eras.

Life and career
In 1931 Pirrotta earned a degree in art history from the University of Florence after having already earned a diploma in organ performance. He established himself as an important academic with his first book, Il Sacchetti e la Tecnica Musicale (1935, with Ettore Li Gotti) which focused on the music and poetry of the Trecento. He went on to publish several more works on that topic and became one of the most important scholars on the Italian Ars Nova, Florentine Camerata, and early opera. In 1970 his book Li Dui Orfei (later published in English in 1982 as Music and Theater from Poliziano to Monteverdi), which traced the pre-history of opera, was awarded the Kinkeldey Award by the American Musicological Society.

In 1954 he became a visiting professor at Princeton University. He joined the faculty of Harvard University in 1956 where he held the posts of both the Naumburg Professor of Music and Chief Music Librarian. He served as head of the music department from 1965 to 1968, after which he continued to teach at Harvard through 1972. From 1972 until his retirement (with the exception on 1979 when he was once again at Harvard) he taught at the University of Rome as the chair of musicology. He died in 1998 at the age of 89.

Selected bibliography

References

1908 births
1998 deaths
Harvard University faculty
Harvard University librarians
Academic staff of the Sapienza University of Rome
Writers from Palermo
Princeton University faculty
University of Florence alumni
20th-century Italian musicologists
Music librarians
Corresponding Fellows of the British Academy